The songs found on the album were written and recorded before the Toilet Böys' final tour with the Red Hot Chili Peppers, started on 23rd January 2003. This album also includes one new track ("Drug of Choice") recorded by the three remaining members of the band Sean, Guy and Electric Eddie and a remix by each of them.

Track listing
Sex Music
Nothing to Lose
Gimme Everything
Astrological
Gods and Monsters
Carbona Not Glue (Ramones cover)
Drug of Choice
Let's Do It Again
XXX Music (The Cult of Sean Pierce Remix)
Nothing to Lose (Miss Guy Loves Daddy mix)
Drug of Choice (Electric Eddie Meets Bryin Dall Remix)

References

Toilet Böys albums
2007 compilation albums